Renigunta is a 2009 Indian Tamil-language action film written and directed by R. Panneerselvam. The film stars Johnny and Sanusha, while Nishanth, Theepetti Ganesan, Thamizh, and Sandeep play supporting roles. The music was composed by Ganesh Raghavendra with cinematography by Shakthi and editing by Anthony. The film released on 4 December 2009 and was a sleeper hit success.

The movie takes its name from the city of Renigunta, Andhra Pradesh where part of the action takes place. It speaks about juvenile delinquents and explores the reasons that instigate them to commit crime.  It was dubbed into Telugu and released in Andhra Pradesh in 2012. The film was remade in Kannada as Mandya to Mumbai (2016).

Plot
The movie begins in Madurai where a young boy, Sakthi (Johnny), leads a happy life with his parents. A shocking incident changes his life: his parents are murdered by an anti-social. As Sakthi seeks revenge, he is arrested and sent to prison, where he is severely beaten by the guards. While in jail, he is befriended by four young criminals: Pandurangan aka Pandu (Nishanth), Prem Kumar aka Dabba (Theepetti Ganesan), Mari (Thamizh) and Michael (Sandeep). When these hardcore criminals break loose from the prison, Sakthi follows them, and they help him take revenge on his parents' killers. They take a train to Mumbai, where they plan to become big gangsters. But fate has other plans: they land at Renigunta, where they come across Bunker (Bunker), who acts as a mediator between contract killers and clients.

Through Bunker, the boys get the acquaintance of Sardar, an influential don who takes them seriously after a successful murder in the town. Meanwhile, Sakthi comes across a mute girl (Sanusha) in the neighbourhood. After a few encounters, romance blossoms between them. But the girl's uncle plans to push her into flesh trade. Taking pity on Sakthi and the girl, his friends decide to help them elope, but only after they complete a final murder for Sardar.

But all plans go haywire when they execute their murder plans. Pandu is killed at the scene, and later Sakthi and Mari blame Sardar and Bunker for abandoning their friend. A fight breaks, and Mari is killed before Sakthi kills both Sardar and Bunker. Sakthi reunites with Dabba and Michael, but they are now chased by the police. He sends a message to his girlfriend, telling her to meet him at a train station so they can elope together. But while she is waiting for him there, the police finally finds the three boys. Michael and Dabba are killed, while Sakthi escapes by running and hiding in a train. As the train starts moving, Sakthi believes that no one can get hold of him, and he leans out of the train door dreaming of his girlfriend. But as the train reaches a station, he is shot dead by Police Inspector Radha Krishnan. The film ends with the mute girl waiting for Sakthi at a railway station down the line.

Cast

Soundtrack
The soundtrack was composed by Ganesh Raghavendra with lyrics written by Piraisoodan, Yugabharathi, and Na. Muthukumar.
"Tallakulam" — Silambarasan
"Mazhai Peiyum" — Harish Raghavendra
"Vizhigalile" — Bombay Jayashree
"Vazhkai" — Vijay Yesudas
"Kanne" — Shreya Ghoshal
"Gandharvanin" — Ranjitha

Reception

Renigunta did fairly well at the box office, ending up as the  most profitable Tamil movie of the year, with a profit of 0.65 crores.

Rediff wrote "It's clear that Panneerselvam has been heavily influenced by new-age gangster flicks and rural movies [..] If only he'd actually made way for a cast iron plot, this one would have fared better." Sify wrote "On the whole the film drags big time post interval and is too long at 2 hours, 35 minutes. The songs act as speed breakers and some scenes are repeated, especially the gory killings. The film is dark and disturbing." Behindwoods wrote "Renigunta is not a movie made with commercial intentions in mind. Though violence and brutality are constants throughout the movie, it is neither superficial nor forced."

Remakes

In 2016 Renigunta was remade & released in Kannada as Mandya to Mumbai with only Actor Theepetti Ganesan reprising his role.

References

External links
 

Indian action films
2009 action films
2009 films
2000s Tamil-language films
Indian films about revenge
Films shot in Madurai
Films set in Andhra Pradesh
Films shot in Andhra Pradesh
Tamil films remade in other languages
2009 directorial debut films